This is a list of programs produced by Fremantle, a British-based international television content, production, and distribution subsidiary of Bertelsmann's RTL Group, Europe's largest TV, radio, and production company.

Fremantle North America

495 Productions 
495 Productions' programs are largely owned by other companies.

Original Productions

Random House Studio

FremantleMedia Kids and Family 
As of 25 January 2018, FremantleMedia Kids & Family Entertainment is now owned by Boat Rocker Media. The purchase also included children's programmes produced by Thames Television.

Animation Collective 

 Leader Dog (2004)
 Tortellini Western (2004)
 Kappa Mikey (2006–2008)
 Thumb Wrestling Federation (2006–2010)
 Ellen's Acres (2006–2007)
 Dancing Sushi (2007)
 Three Delivery (2008–2009)

As of September 2018, the Animation Collective library is distributed by Cake Entertainment.

Fremantle UK

Naked

Boundless

Hare and Tortoise

Talkback

Thames

Thames Television

Reeves Entertainment

Euston Films

Dancing Ledge Productions

Talkback Thames

Alomo Productions

Regent Productions

Pearson Television

ACI 
Programs produced by Hill/Fields and its predecessors, Tisch/Avnet Productions, Michael Jaffe Films, and Steve White Entertainment are currently owned by Multicom Entertainment Group.

All-American Television/Fremantle Production (1980–1998)

Goodson-Todman/Mark Goodson Productions

Fremantle Australia

Grundy Television

Reg Grundy Productions

Crackerjack Productions

Eureka Productions

Easy Tiger Productions

Fremantle Italy

Wildside

Television movies and specials

Fremantle North America
 The Great Halloween Fright Fight (2014)
 Double Dare at the Super Bowl (2019) (co-production with Nickelodeon Productions)

Talkback
 Sword of Honour (2001)
 The Best of Boart (2001)
 Shoreditch Twat (2002)
 Anglian Lives with Alan Partridge (2003)

Naked
 Manson: The Lost Tapes (2018)
 Call in the Cheapstakes (2021)
 The Love Triangle (2021)

Thames Television
 A Performance of Macbeth (1979)
 The Plank (1979)
 The Treaty (1991) (co-production with RTÉ)
 Gawain and the Green Knight (1991)

Euston Films
 The Naked Civil Servant (1975)
 Charlie Muffin (1979)
 The Knowledge (1979)
 Stainless Steel and the Star Spies (1981)

Talkback Thames
 Poisoned (2005)
 Friends and Crocodiles (2006)
 Gideon's Daughter (2006) (co-production with Spotlight Films)
 When Kim & Aggie Went to Hospital (2006)
 The Yellow House (2007)
 Joe's Palace (2007) (co-production with HBO Films)
 Capturing Mary (2007) (co-production with HBO Films)
 Neighbours' on Five (2008)
 The Shooting of Thomas Hurndall (2008)
 The Bill Made Me Famous (2008) (co-production with Mentorn Media)
 Kirsten's Topless Ambition (2009)
 I Dreamed a Dream: The Susan Boyle Story (2009) (co-production with Syco Entertainment)
 Farewell 'The Bill (2010)
 Paddy McGuinness' Walk the Line (2011)
 QI Genesis (2011) (co-production with Quite Interesting Limited)
 Holy Flying Circus (2011) (co-production with HillBilly Television)

ACI
 Snowbound: The Jim and Jennifer Stolpa Story (1994) (co-production with Pacific Motion Pictures, Jaffe/Braunstein Films and Spectacor Films)
 The Other Woman (1995) (co-production with Patricia K. Meyer Productions and Von Zerneck Sertner Films
 The Killing Secret (1997) (co-production with Robert Greenwald Productions)
 Touched By Evil (1997) (co-production with Media Arts Management and Vin Di Bona Productions)
 ...First Do No Harm (1997) (co-production with Pebblehut Productions and Jaffe/Braunstein Films)
 I'll Be Home for Christmas (1997) (co-production with Pebblehut Productions and Jaffe/Braunstein Films)

Mark Goodson Productions
 What's My Line at 25 (1975)
 TV's Funniest Game Show Moments (1984)
 TV's Funniest Game Show Moments #2 (1985)

Fremantle Australia
 Top 20 Aussie Soap Moments (2011)
 Schapelle (2014)
 Neighbours 30th: The Stars Reunite (2015)
 Sleeping Beauty: Behind the Curtain (2015) (co-production with Stella Motion Pictures)
 Mary: The Making of a Princess (2015)
 Wentworth: Screen Fest (2020)
 Wentworth: Unlocked (2021)
 Boomer's Spinoff Behind the Scenes (2021)

References 

Television series
RTL